Transit is the fourth studio album by American singer-songwriter A. J. Croce, released in 2000 (see 2000 in music).

Track listing
"Maybe" (Croce, Michael James) – 3:58
"It's Only Me [Oh Ya-Ya]" (Croce) – 2:59
"Turn Out the Light" (Croce, James) – 3:22
"Summer Can't Come Too Soon" (Croce, Dave Howard) – 3:35
"The Bargain" (Croce) – 3:22
"Find Out Now" (Croce) – 4:35
"Everyman" (Croce, Howard) – 3:08
"What I Wouldn't Do" (Croce, James, David Zemen) – 3:04
"Change" (Croce) – 2:26
"Five" (Croce) – 2:58
"She Was Always Right" (Croce) – 3:13
"Don't Leave Me Now" (Croce, Marlo Croce) – 3:43

Singles

One single was released on 45 and cd single:

Maybe b/w Summer Can't Come Too Soon

Personnel
A. J. Croce – piano, vocals

Production
Producers: Michael James, David Zeman
Executive producers: Matt Marshall, Dan Selene
Engineers: Michael James, Cesar Ramirez, Fredrik Sarhagen
Assistant engineer: Jesse Gorman
Mixing: Michael James, Urban Olsson
Mastering: David Donnelly
Art direction: Robert Fisher
Design: Robert Fisher
Photography: Alison Dyer

A. J. Croce albums
2000 albums